The Samajwadi Party ( SP; translation: Socialist Party,  founded 4 October 1992) is a socialist political party in India. Headquartered in New Delhi, the party has mass base in Uttar Pradesh along with significant presence in other states as well. With a secular and democratic ideology, the Samajwadi Party believes in creating a socialist society, which works on the principle of equality. The party has been able to form the government in the state of Uttar Pradesh four times - three times under Chief Minister Mulayam Singh Yadav, the fourth and recent being Chief Minister Akhilesh Yadav’s full majority government in 2012-2017 Uttar Pradesh Legislative Assembly. The coalition of party and it’s alliance partners SP+ has one of the largest vote base in the state of Uttar Pradesh in terms of collective voting pattern in the state-based electoral system, with more than 37% vote share in 2022 elections.

History
The Samajwadi Party was one of several parties that emerged when the Janata Dal (People's League) fragmented into several regional parties. The party was founded by Mulayam Singh Yadav in 1992. Created just months before the Babri Masjid demolition, the party is said to having played a key role in preventing violence within the state following the event. The Samajwadi Party is now led by former Chief Minister of Uttar Pradesh Akhilesh Yadav after he was chosen the President by the National Convention held on 1 January, 2017.

The Samajwadi Party is primarily based in Uttar Pradesh State. It has contested Lok Sabha and State Assembly elections around the country, though its successes have been mainly in Uttar Pradesh. In the 2012 legislative assembly elections of Uttar Pradesh, SP registered a landslide victory with a clear majority in the House, thus enabling it to form a government in the state. This was expected to be the fifth term of Mulayam Singh Yadav as Chief Minister of state, but he selected his son, Akhilesh Yadav, instead. It became official on 15 March. It was also the first time that SP was head of the UP government for a full term of five years. However, the party suffered a landslide defeat in the 2017 Uttar Pradesh Legislative Assembly Election, slumping to only 47 seats as the Bharatiya Janata Party swept to victory.

Proposed merger 
In 2014, there was a proposed merger of the Samajwadi Party with some other Janata Parivar parties uniting with Lalu Prasad Yadav and Nitish Kumar.

National Convention of January 2017 
In a National Convention held on 1 January 2017 called by Ram Gopal Yadav, Akhilesh Yadav was appointed as president of the party.

Position in state and national politics
The Samajwadi Party provided outside support to the United Progressive Alliance government up to the fourteenth general election. After the fourteenth general election, its support became unnecessary when the UPA became the largest alliance. It contested the 2009 general election in alliance with the Rashtriya Janata Dal and the Lok Janshakti Party of Bihar.

In the last general election, the Samajwadi Party was defeated by the BJP in Uttar Pradesh. It is currently the thirteenth largest party in parliament. In the general elections of 2019, it won only 5 seats, while the Indian National Congress gained 52 seats and the Bharatiya Janata Party obtained a clear mandate with 303 seats.

In West Bengal, the West Bengal Socialist Party of Kiranmoy Nanda merged with the SP. The SP has two MLAs each in Madhya Pradesh, Maharashtra and one newly elected MLA in 2022 Gujarat assembly election.

In April 2014, the Save Indian Family Foundation encouraged voters to support the Samajwadi Party or vote None of the above because the Samajwadi Party had stated that it opposed the alleged misuse of gender bias laws.

Samajwadi Prahari and Samajwadi Sanwad 

The Samajwadi Party has Samajwadi Prahari frontline groups.Party has leading leaders from different fields Through Samajwadi Sanwad, the revolutionary ideas of these leaders will be spread in the society. Some of them are:
 Chhatra Sabha Sanwad
 Yuvjan Sabha Sanwad
 Samajwadi prahari Sanwad
 Mulayam Singh Youth Brigade Sanwad
 Lohiya Vahini Sanwad
 Shikshak Sabha Sanwad
 Vyapar Sabha Sanwad
 Adhivakta Sabha Sanwad
 Ambedkar Vahini Samwad

Electoral performances

List of chief ministers

List of central ministers

Prominent members

 Mulayam Singh Yadav, founder and former President of Samajwadi Party, former Defence minister of India and former Chief Minister of Uttar Pradesh.
 Janeshwar Mishra, founder and former cabinet minister
 Shivpal Singh Yadav, Former State President of Samajwadi Party, Member of Legislative Assembly from Jaswantnagar - 6th term, Former Cabinet Minister(UP Govt.), Former Leader of Opposition
 Anantram Jaiswal former Member of Parliament, Lok Sabha, Member of Parliament, Rajya Sabha, Minister and Samajwadi Ideologist, Founding member 
 Akhilesh Yadav, President of Samajwadi Party and former chief minister of Uttar Pradesh.
 Kiranmoy Nanda, Vice President of Samajwadi Party
 Naresh Uttam Patel, current Uttar Pradesh State president of Samajwadi Party.
 Azam Khan, Member of Parliament,  9 time MLA, Member of Parliament Loksabha Rampur former cabinet minister of Uttar Pradesh and former Member of Rajya Sabha from Uttar Pradesh.
 Jaya Bachchan,Indian actress and Rajya Sabha MP from Uttar Pradesh.
 Ram Govind Chaudhary, Leader of opposition in Uttar Pradesh Legislative Assembly.
 Indrajit Saroj, National General Secretary,Deputy Leader of Opposition in Uttar Pradesh Legislative Assembly
 Sanjay Lathar, Leader of Opposition in Uttar Pradesh Legislative Council.
 Abu Asim Azmi, Samajwadi Party Maharashtra state President, Member of Maharashtra Legislative Assembly and former Member of Rajya Sabha.
Mohan Singh, former Member of Parliament Rajya Sabha
 Harendra Singh Malik, former MP Rajya Sabha, prominent Jat leader from Western Uttar Pradesh.
 Pankaj Kumar Malik, MLA from Charthawal Assembly Seat.
 Vishambhar Prasad Nishad, Samajwadi Party General Secretary, Rajya Sabha MP, former Member of Lok Sabha, and former Cabinet Minister of Uttar Pradesh.
Pradeep Bhati, A prominent young Gurjar Leader and Spokesperson of Samajwadi Partry.

State leadership
 Abu Asim Azmi: Maharashtra
 Naresh Uttam Patel: Uttar Pradesh
 Ramayan Singh Patel: Madhya Pradesh
 Satyanarayan Sachan: Uttarakhand
 Manjappa Yadav: Karnataka
 Devendra Upadhyaya: Gujarat
 Manas Bhattacharya: West Bengal
Mukesh Yadav: Rajasthan

See also
 Ghanshyam Tiwari (Indian politician)
 Pragatisheel Samajwadi Party (Lohiya)
 Samajwadi Secular Morcha
 United People's Party of Assam

References

External links 

 

 
1992 establishments in Uttar Pradesh
Democratic socialist parties in Asia
Full member parties of the Socialist International
Janata Parivar
Left-wing parties
Political parties established in 1992
Populist parties
Progressive Alliance